

Portugal
 Angola – 
 Manuel de Almeida e Vasconcelos, Governor of Angola (1790–1797)
 Miguel António de Melo, Governor of Angola (1797–1802)
 Macau –
 Jose Manuel Pinto, Governor of Macau (1793–1797)
 D. Cristovao Pereira de Castro, Governor of Macau (1797–1800)

Spanish Empire
Viceroyalty of New Granada –
 José Manuel de Ezpeleta, Viceroy of New Granada (1789–1797)
 Pedro Mendinueta y Múzquiz, Viceroy of New Granada (1797–1803)
Viceroyalty of New Spain –Miguel de la Grúa Talamanca, 1st Marquis of Branciforte, Viceroy of New Spain (1794–1798)
Captaincy General of Cuba – Juan Procopio Bassecourt y Bryas, Governor of Cuba (1796–1799)
Spanish East Indies – Rafael María de Aguilar y Ponce de León, Governor-General of the Philippines (1793–1806)
Commandancy General of the Provincias Internas – Pedro da Nava, Commandant General of the Interior Provinces (1793–1802)
Viceroyalty of Peru – Ambrosio O'Higgins, Viceroy of Perú (1796–1801)
Captaincy General of Chile – Gabriel de Avilés, Captain General of Chile (1796–1799)
Viceroyalty of the Río de la Plata –
 Pedro de Melo (1795–1797)
 Antonio de Olaguer y Feliú (1797–1799)

Kingdom of Great Britain
 Jamaica – Alexander Lindsay, 6th Earl of Balcarres, Governor of Jamaica (1795–1801)
 New South Wales – John Hunter, Governor of New South Wales (1795–1800)
India – Richard Wellesley, 1st Marquess Wellesley (1797–1805)

Colonial governors
Colonial governors
1797